Our Lady of Liberation is a church built in an old fort located at nearly 500 meters of altitude, near the hamlet of Chapelle des Buis on the outskirts of the city of Besançon in the department of Doubs in Eastern France.

History 
Our Lady of Liberation was dedicated after the Second World War by bishop Maurice-Louis Dubourg, intending to build a monument if Besançon had not been devastated by the bombing. Subsequently, plaques lining the walls of the building, pay homage to diocesans and all inhabitants of Besançon who died during World War II, were added, as well as a monumental statue of the Virgin Mary with a height of seven meters.

Buildings and structures in Besançon
Churches in Doubs
World War II memorials in France
Roman Catholic churches in Besançon
Tourist attractions in Besançon